Gillam is an English surname and it may refer to:

People
 Barbara Gillam, Australian psychologist
 Bernhard Gillam (1856–1896), American political cartoonist (Puck, Judge)
 David Gillam, founder and artistic director of Wales One World Film Festival
 Emily Gillam (born 1977), New Zealand field hockey player 
 Jeremy Gillam (born 1976), member of the Arkansas House of Representatives
 Jess Gillam (born 1988), British saxophonist
 Matty Gillam (born 1997), English footballer
 Ray Gillam (20th century), Australian rugby league player
 Robert Gillam, American investor
 Tony Gillam (born 1961), British writer and musician
 Victor Gillam (ca. 1858–1920), American political cartoonist (Judge)

Places
 Gillam, Manitoba, Canada
 Gillam Airport, Manitoba, Canada
 Gillam Township, Indiana, United States

See also
 Gillams (disambiguation)
 Gilliam (disambiguation)